Márcio Miguel da Costa Fernandes (born 18 May 1983) is a Paralympic athlete who has represented Cape Verde at both the 2012 and the 2012 Summer Paralympics. He was born in Portugal to Cape Verdean parents. He lost his leg in a car accident at age 10. He is the first Cape Verdean athlete to participate at a Paralympic Games on merit rather than invitation.

References

1983 births
Living people
Paralympic athletes of Cape Verde
Athletes (track and field) at the 2012 Summer Paralympics
Cape Verdean javelin throwers
Amputee category Paralympic competitors
African Games gold medalists for Cape Verde
African Games medalists in athletics (track and field)
African Games silver medalists for Cape Verde
Athletes (track and field) at the 2015 African Games
Portuguese people of Cape Verdean descent